Palatinate-Sulzbach was the name of two separate states of the Holy Roman Empire located in modern Amberg-Sulzbach, Bavaria, Germany, ruled by a branch of the House of Wittelsbach.

Palatinate-Sulzbach (1569–1604)

Palatinate-Sulzbach was partitioned from Palatinate-Zweibrücken upon the death of Wolfgang, Count Palatine of Zweibrücken in 1569. His will provided that Palatinate-Sulzbach should be created out of Palatinate-Zweibrücken and ruled by his younger son Otto Henry. Otto Henry died in 1604 without any heirs so Palatinate-Sulzbach passed to Palatinate-Neuburg.

Palatinate-Sulzbach (1614–1742)

In 1614, Palatinate-Sulzbach was partitioned from Palatinate-Neuburg following the death of Count Palatine Philip Louis for his son Augustus.  It consisted of two noncontiguous areas separated by the Electorate of Bavaria.  It was bordered on the west by the territory of the Imperial city of Nuremberg and on the east by the Kingdom of Bohemia.

Augustus' successor Christian Augustus was a tolerant ruler who allowed his subjects to choose their religious denomination, introduced the simultaneum, allowed Jews to live in Sulzbach in 1666, and established an important printing industry. It became clear during the reigns of his successors that Palatinate-Sulzbach would inherit the Electorate of the Palatinate following the death of Charles III Philip, but this would only occur in 1742 for Charles Theodore.

House of Wittelsbach
Counties of the Holy Roman Empire
Bavarian Circle
Counts Palatine of Sulzbach
History of the Palatinate (region)
1569 establishments in the Holy Roman Empire
States and territories established in 1569
States and territories established in 1614
States and territories disestablished in 1604
States and territories disestablished in 1742